Sharmila Chakraborty (born 4 March 1961 in West Bengal) is a former Test and One Day International cricketer who represented the India national women's cricket team. She played in India's first women's Test match, against the West Indies, in 1976.

References

1961 births
India women One Day International cricketers
India women Test cricketers
Indian women cricketers
Living people
Bengal women cricketers
Sportswomen from West Bengal
Cricketers from West Bengal